Ženski košarkaški klub Vrbas is a Serbian women's basketball team from Vrbas, Serbia. The club currently plays in Serbian first league.

History
Vrbas was founded in 1975. He began working as a school section of the high school "Žarko Zrenjanin", which was led by Professor Zdravko Bjelica, to the same year became the club. The first coach was Peter Kankaraš. With more or less success, the club has been functioning for 40 years.

At the end of the 80s competed in the Yugoslav Second Federal League which then played in venues all over Yugoslavia. Since 2011 ŽKK Vrbas is a member of the Serbian first league, and their teams had players who were on the scene for team, Tijana Ajduković, Nataša Mijatović, Ivana Jovović, Tijana Cukić, Tamara Rajić, etc.

Honours
National Cups – 0
Milan Ciga Vasojević Cup:
Runners-up (1) : 2016

Arena

Teodora Sarić

Notable former players
Tijana Ajduković
Nataša Mijatović
Ivana Jovović
Tijana Cukić
Tamara Rajić
Nataša Bučevac
Jovana Vukoje
Tatjana Živanović

Notable former coaches

References

External links
 Profile on eurobasket.com
 Profile on srbijasport.net

Vrbas
Women's basketball teams in Yugoslavia
Basketball teams established in 1975
Sport in Vrbas, Serbia